Trimeresurus schultzei, commonly known as the Schultze's pitviper, is a venomous pitviper species endemic to the Philippines. No subspecies are currently recognized.

Etymology
The specific name, schultzei, is in honor of "Mr. W. Schultze" who collected the type specimen.

Description
Scalation includes 21 rows of dorsal scales at midbody, 185-194/192-203 ventral scales in males/females, 67-78/66-75 subcaudal scales in males/females, and 9-11 supralabial scales.

Geographic range
Found in the Philippines on the islands on Palawan and Balabac. The type locality given is "Iwahig, Palawn" (Palawan Island, Philippines).

References

Further reading
Griffin. L.E. 1909. A List of Snakes Found in Palawan. Philippine Journ. Sci. 4: 595–601. ("Trimeresurus schultzei n. sp.", p. 601.)

External links
 

schultzei
Reptiles described in 1909